Mohamed Ali Sghir is a Tunisian team handball coach. He coaches the Tunisian national team, and participated at the 2011 World Women's Handball Championship in Brazil.

References

Living people
Tunisian handball coaches
Year of birth missing (living people)